The cinereous-breasted spinetail (Synallaxis hypospodia) is a species of bird in the family Furnariidae.  The term cinereous describes its colouration.  It is found in northern Bolivia, Brazil and far southeastern Peru. Its natural habitats are subtropical or tropical seasonally wet or flooded lowland grassland and heavily degraded former forest.

References

cinereous-breasted spinetail
Birds of the Bolivian Amazon
Birds of Brazil
cinereous-breasted spinetail
cinereous-breasted spinetail
Taxonomy articles created by Polbot